Musa tuberculata is a tropical Asian species of plant in the banana family native to the Malesian region (Brunei). It is one of fourteen species of Musa endemic to the island of Borneo. The specific epithet "tuberculata" is from the Latin meaning "covered with minute tubercles".  M. tuberculata is placed in section Callimusa (now including the former section Australimusa), members of which have a diploid chromosome number of 2n = 20.

References

tuberculata
Plants described in 1967
Endemic flora of Borneo
Flora of Brunei